Massacre Divine is a studio album by the band Discharge released in 1991 on Clay Records.

Track listing
"City of Fear" - 3:11
"F.E.D." - 2:34
"Lost Tribe Rising" - 3:02
"Challenge Terror" - 3:31
"White Knuckle Ride" - 2:25
"New Age" - 3:39
"Terror Police" - 2:34
"Kiss Tomorrow Goodbye" - 2:30
"Sexplosion" - 2:56
"Dying Time" - 2:23
"E# 2. 30" - 1:45
"F.E.D. (F2 mix)" - 5:04
"Terror Police (F2 mix)" - 5:30

References

1991 albums
Discharge (band) albums